The kryptonium ion, KrH+, is a hypothetical onium ion, consisting of protonated krypton.  Although salts of the fluorokryptonium ion, KrF+, are known to exist, the existence of the kryptonium cation itself has not been proven.

References

Cations
Hypothetical chemical compounds